Argyle Airport is at Lake Argyle, Western Australia, Australia (IATA: GYL, ICAO: YARG).

Argyle Airport may also refer to:

 Argyle Airport (New York) in Argyle, New York, United States (FAA: 1C3)
 Argyle International Airport, St. Vincent & the Grenadines ((IATA: SVD, ICAO: TVSA)